Juan Huertas Garcia is a Panamanian boxer. At the 2012 Summer Olympics, he competed in the Men's lightweight, but was defeated in the first round against Puerto Rican Félix Verdejo.

References

Year of birth missing (living people)
Living people
Olympic boxers of Panama
Boxers at the 2012 Summer Olympics
Lightweight boxers
Panamanian male boxers
21st-century Panamanian people